Chris Colbert (born September 27, 1996) is an American professional boxer who held the WBA interim super featherweight title from 2020 to August 2021.

Professional career
Colbert made his professional debut on May 29, 2015, scoring a second-round technical knockout (TKO) victory over Marquis Pierce at the Barclays Center in New York City. He had three more fights in 2015; a fourth-round TKO win over Benjamin Burgos in June and unanimous decision (UD) victories over Jose Carmona and Derrick Bivins in September and December respectively.  

He only fought once in 2016, scoring a UD win over Antonio Dubose in June. Following two more UD victories in 2017 over Wilfredo Garriga in March and Titus Williams in November, Colbert defeated Austin Dulay via seventh-round corner retirement (RTD) in April 2018. His second and final fight of that year was a UD win over Fatiou Fassinou in September. 

He secured three more wins in the first half of 2019; a UD against Joshuah Hernandez in January; a second-round TKO over Mario Briones in April; and a UD against Alberto Mercado in June.

Colbert vs. Beltran Jr 
His first attempt at a professional title came on September 21, 2019, against two time world title challenger Miguel Beltrán Jr. at the Rabobank Theater in Bakersfield, California. Colbert won the bout via first-round KO to capture the vacant NABA-USA lightweight title.

Colbert vs. Corrales 
Colbert was booked to face Jezreel Corrales for the vacant WBA interim super featherweight title on January 18, 2020. Corrales was ranked #10 by the WBA at super featherweight. He won the fight by unanimous decision, with scores of 116–111, 117–110 and 117–110.

Colbert vs. Arboleda 
Colbert made his first interim title defense against Jaime Arboleda on December 12, 2020. Arboleda was ranked #4 by the WBA at super featherweight. He won the fight by an eleventh-round technical knockout.

Colbert vs. Nyambayar 
Colbert made his second title defense against the one-time WBC featherweight title challenger Tugstsogt Nyambayar on July 3, 2021. Nyambayar was ranked #4 by the WBA at super featherweight. He won the fight by unanimous decision, with scores of 117–111, 118–110 and 118–110.

Colbert vs. Garcia 
On August 25, 2021, the WBA eliminated all of their interim championships, with the intent of consolidating titles across weight classes. Accordingly, Colbert earned was designated as the mandatory challenger for the WBA (Regular) super featherweight champion Roger Gutiérrez. They were expect to face each other on February 26, 2022, at the Cosmopolitan in Las Vegas, Nevada. Gutiérrez withdrew from the bout two weeks before it was supposed to take place, as he tested positive for COVID-19. Colbert was rescheduled to face Hector Luis Garcia, in a WBA super featherweight title eliminator. In a surprise upset, the unheralded Garcia dominated the heavy favorite Colbert, knocking Colbert down in the seventh round and winning a unanimous decision with judges' scorecards of 119–108 and 118–109 twice.

Professional boxing record

References

Living people
1996 births
American male boxers
Boxers from New York City
Sportspeople from Brooklyn
Lightweight boxers

External links
Chris Colbert - Profile, News Archive & Current Rankings at Box.Live